"Stranger Things Have Happened" is a song written by Roger Murrah and Keith Stegall, and recorded by American country music artist Ronnie Milsap.  It was released in February 1990 as the fourth single and title track from the album Stranger Things Have Happened.  The song reached #2 on the Billboard Hot Country Singles & Tracks chart.

Chart performance

Year-end charts

References

1990 singles
Ronnie Milsap songs
Songs written by Roger Murrah
Songs written by Keith Stegall
Song recordings produced by Tom Collins (record producer)
RCA Records singles
1989 songs